FK Jaunība may be:

 FK Jaunība — defunct Latvian football club from Daugavpils.
 FK Jaunība — Latvian football club from Riga.